The 2012–13 Marshall Thundering Herd men's basketball team represented Marshall University during the 2012–13 NCAA Division I men's basketball season. The Thundering Herd, led by third year head coach Tom Herrion, played their home games at the Cam Henderson Center and were members of Conference USA. They finished the season 13–19, 6–10 in C-USA play to finish in a tie for ninth place. They lost in the first round of the Conference USA tournament to Tulane.

Preseason

Recruiting

Roster

Schedule 

|-
!colspan=9| Exhibition

|-
!colspan=9| Regular season

|-
!colspan=9| 2013 Conference USA men's basketball tournament

References

Marshall Thundering Herd men's basketball seasons
Marshall
Marsh
Marsh